In the mathematics of matroids and lattices, a geometric lattice is a finite atomistic semimodular lattice, and a matroid lattice is an atomistic semimodular lattice without the assumption of finiteness. Geometric lattices and matroid lattices, respectively, form the lattices of flats of finite and infinite matroids, and every geometric or matroid lattice comes from a matroid in this way.

Definition
 The following definitions apply to posets in general, not just lattices, except where otherwise stated.
 For a minimal element , there is no element  such that .
 A cover of a minimal element is called an atom.
 A lattice is atomistic if every element is the supremum of some set of atoms.
 A poset is graded when it can be given a rank function  mapping its elements to integers, such that  whenever , and also  whenever .
 When a graded poset has a bottom element, one may assume, without loss of generality, that its rank is zero.  In this case, the atoms are the elements with rank one.
 
 A matroid lattice is a lattice that is both atomistic and semimodular.  A geometric lattice is a finite matroid lattice.
 Many authors consider only finite matroid lattices, and use the terms "geometric lattice" and "matroid lattice" interchangeably for both.

Lattices vs. matroids
The geometric lattices are equivalent to (finite, simple) matroids, and the matroid lattices are equivalent to simple matroids without the assumption of finiteness (under an appropriate definition of infinite matroids; there are several such definitions).  The correspondence is that the elements of the matroid are the atoms of the lattice and an element x of the lattice corresponds to the flat of the matroid that consists of those elements of the matroid that are atoms 

Like a geometric lattice, a matroid is endowed with a rank function, but that function maps a set of matroid elements to a number rather than taking a lattice element as its argument.  The rank function of a matroid must be monotonic (adding an element to a set can never decrease its rank) and it must be submodular, meaning that it obeys an inequality similar to the one for semimodular ranked lattices:

for sets X and Y of matroid elements.  
The maximal sets of a given rank are called flats. The intersection of two flats is again a flat, defining a greatest lower bound operation on pairs of flats; one can also define a least upper bound of a pair of flats to be the (unique) maximal superset of their union that has the same rank as their union. In this way, the flats of a matroid form a matroid lattice, or (if the matroid is finite) a geometric lattice.

Conversely, if  is a matroid lattice, one may define a rank function on sets of its atoms, by defining the rank of a set of atoms to be the lattice rank of the greatest lower bound of the set. This rank function is necessarily monotonic and submodular, so it defines a matroid. This matroid is necessarily simple, meaning that every two-element set has rank two.

These two constructions, of a simple matroid from a lattice and of a lattice from a matroid, are inverse to each other: starting from a geometric lattice or a simple matroid, and performing both constructions one after the other, gives a lattice or matroid that is isomorphic to the original one.

Duality
Some matroids do not have adjoints; an example is the Vámos matroid.

Additional properties
Every interval of a geometric lattice (the subset of the lattice between given lower and upper bound elements) is itself geometric; taking an interval of a geometric lattice corresponds to forming a minor of the associated matroid. Geometric lattices are complemented, and because of the interval property they are also relatively complemented.

Every finite lattice is a sublattice of a geometric lattice.

References

External links
 
 

Lattice theory
Matroid theory